The 2017 Dalian Yifang F.C. season was the eighth season in club history.

Dalian Yifang won the League One title, and will be able to compete again in the Chinese top-tier league next season, after a 3-year-absence.

Squad

First team squad

Zhu Ting was no longer the captain after his suspension, Wang Wanpeng was responsible for the rest of the season.

Reserve squad

Coaching staff 
As of 2017 season

Transfers
It's been reported that they have met with Samuel Eto'o, but finally signed Yannick Boli from Anzhi Makhachkala. For domestic players, Sun Guowen, who claimed his contract with Aerbin was illegal and refused to renew it, has returned after the local court judged the contract to be valid.

In

Out

Kits

Preseason

Training matches

China League One

Review
Dalian Yifang signed Spanish manager Juan Ramón López Caro before the season. The team will aim to gain promotion back to the Super League.

Juan Caro brought an effective strategy based on high pressing, long pass and quick counterattack, while the team significantly improved defence tactics by signing Jonathan Ferrari and Zhou Ting. Dalian Yifang achieved four consecutive winnings at the beginning of the season, and won 8 matches out of the first 10. By May, they were the team with the best defense, with only 5 goals conceded.

After beating Shenzhen F.C. on 7 May, Dalian Yifang went top for the first time within 708 days, since they led the league at the beginning of 2015 season. During the match, Shenzhen F.C. player Wang Dalong committed a rude foul to Nyasha Mushekwi, causing considerable damage to his right leg. After a 4–0 victory against Yunnan Lijiang F.C. on 18 June, Yifang ensured its position as the Summer Champion, with two matches yet to compete.

During the match with Xinjiang Tianshan Leopard, Mushekwi scored the 100th goal since the team was occupied by Dalian Yifang. The gap between them and Beijing Renhe came to 9 points after the match, but was reduced to 2 points after losing the second-leg match with Beijing Renhe, and their record of remain undefeated for 18 matches in a row was also terminated.

Yannick Boli scored the first hat trick in squad this season against Shanghai Shenxin on 23 September.

After winning the derby against Dalian Transcendence on 15 October, Yifang ensured a promotion back to the Chinese top-tier league, after competing 3 seasons (1078 days approximately) in China League One. Congratulatory messages were sent by both Dalian municipal government and Sun Xishaung, owner of the team. On 21 October, as Beijing Renhe was beaten by Hohhot Zhongyou, Dalian Yifang was led to the league title.

Dalian Yifang U17 Team claimed the title of 2017 China League One elite reserve team league on 21 November().

League table

Results summary

Position by round

League fixtures and results
Fixtures as of 24 February 2017. Some fixtures may be adjusted if necessary.

Chinese FA Cup

FA Cup fixtures and results

Squad statistics

League performance data
As of 28 October.

Suspensions
Zhu Ting received a severe 7-match suspension because he spitted at the referee and misbehaved during the handshake, after the match against Shijiazhuang Ever Bright on 30 April. Zhou Ting and Boli both received a Red Card during the match against Meizhou Hakka on 2 July. Jin Qiang was the first player in squad to be suspended twice for accumulating four Yellow Cards. During the match with Beijing Renhe, Sun Bo committed a rude tackle, causing an ankle fracture for Ayub Masika, and received a 2-match suspension consequently.

References

Dalian Professional F.C. seasons
Dalian Aerbin F.C.